Ted S. Raicer is a game designer who has worked on board games. He became a board wargamer at the age of 12 years and has published more than 10 games based on World War I. Raicer has won many awards in his gaming career.

Early life and career 
Raicer became a board wargamer in 1970 at the age of 12, when his father bought him the game 1914, designed by James F. Dunnigan and published by Avalon Hill.

Raicer has published more than 10 games based on World War I, including the Paths of Glory board wargame, as well as games on World War II and the Russian Civil War.

Awards and recognition
Raicer has nine Charles S. Roberts Awards, a Games magazine Historical Game of the Year Award (for Paths of Glory), and is a member of the wargamers Hall of Fame.

1993 - Best Historical or Scenario Magazine Article : Command #25 - When Eagles Fight: First World War in the East
1993 - Best Pre–World War Two Game : When Eagles Fight by XTR Corporation
1995 - Best Pre–World War Two Game : Great War in Europe by XTR Corporation
1995 - James F. Dunnigan Award for Playability and Design : Great War in Europe by XTR Corporation
1996 - Charles Roberts Awards Hall of Fame
1997 - Best Pre–World War Two Game : All Quiet on the Western Front by Moments in History
1999 - Best Pre–World War Two Game : Paths of Glory by GMT Games
1999 - James F. Dunnigan Award for Playability and Design : Paths of Glory by GMT Games
2002 - Best World War Two Game : Barbarossa to Berlin by GMT Games

References

Board game designers
Living people
Year of birth missing (living people)